Lieutenant General Hendrik Pieter Laubscher  (20 September 1916 – 22 April 2008) was a South African Army officer, who served as Chief of Staff Logistics from 1975-1978.

Army career 
Laubscher joined the Union Defence Force in 1936 and participated in the Second World War. Paymaster and Quartermaster of the Military College after WW2. Director Administration at the Chief of Defence Staff's section. Chief of Defence Force Administration in 1970-1974. Chief of Staff Logistics from 1 Apr-31 Dec 1974.

Awards and decorations

References

 

1916 births
2008 deaths
South African generals
South African military personnel of World War II